The Directorate-General for Employment, Social Affairs and Inclusion (DG EMPL) is a Directorate-General of the European Commission. It was formerly known as the Directorate-General for Employment, Social Affairs and Equal Opportunities.

The Directorate-General for Employment, Social Affairs and Inclusion has the task of contributing to the development of a modern, innovative and sustainable European social model with more and better jobs in an inclusive society based on equal opportunities.

Structure
The Directorate-General is organised into 8 directorates:
 Directorate A: European Pillar of Social Rights and Strategy
 Directorate B: Jobs and Skills
 Directorate C: Working Conditions and Social Dialogue
 Directorate D: Social Rights and Inclusion
 Directorate E: Labour Mobility and International Affairs
 Directorate F: Employment and Social Governance & Analysis
 Directorate G: Funds Programming and Implementation
 DAC: Joint Audit Directorate for Cohesion

Buying Social
DG EMPL commissioned a report published in 2010 entitled "Buying Social", which provided guidance on how to take "social considerations" into account within the EU and its Member States' public procurement processes. A second edition was published in 2021, updated to reflect changes in the legal context of public procurement following the adoption of the revised Directive on Public Procurement in 2014, and now adding references to green and circular public procurement. The Public Procurement Unit, GROW.C.2 within the Directorate-General for Internal Market, Industry, Entrepreneurship and SMEs, led on the revised publication.

See also
European Commissioner for Jobs and Social Rights
European Agency for Safety and Health at Work (EU-OSHA)
European Centre for the Development of Vocational Training
European Training Foundation

References

External links
Directorate-General for Employment, Social Affairs and Inclusion

Employment, Social Affairs and Equal Opportunities